Craibia is a genus of legume in the family Fabaceae. 
It contains the following species:
 Craibia atlantica
 Craibia brevicaudata

Craibia was named for William Grant Craib (1882–1933), a British botanist who was an Assistant for India at Kew and a professor at Aberdeen University, the author of Contributions to the Flora of Siam (1912) and Florae siamensis enumeratio (1925). The genus Craibia was published in 1911 by British botanist Stephen Troyte Dunn. (PlantZAfrica.com; CRC World Dictionary of Plant Names).

References

Millettieae
Taxonomy articles created by Polbot
Fabaceae genera